Reliable Datagram Sockets (RDS) is a high-performance, low-latency, reliable, connectionless protocol for delivering datagrams. It is developed by Oracle Corporation.

It was included in the Linux kernel 2.6.30 which was released on 9th of June, 2009. The code was contributed by the OpenFabrics Alliance (OFA).

On October 19, 2010, VSR announced , a vulnerability within the Linux 2.6.30 kernel which could result in a local privilege escalation via the kernel's implementation of RDS. This was subsequently fixed in Linux 2.6.36.

On May 8, 2019,  was published, regarding a race condition in the Linux RDS implementation that could lead to a use-after-free bug and possible arbitrary code execution. The bug has been fixed in Linux 5.0.8.

Header

See also
 Transmission Control Protocol
 Stream Control Transmission Protocol
 User Datagram Protocol
 UDP-Lite

References

External links
 Oss.oracle.com
 Oss.oracle.com
 https://oss.oracle.com/projects/rds/dist/documentation/rds-3.1-spec.html

Network socket
Transport layer protocols
Internet protocols
Oracle Corporation